Mathias Schober (born 8 April 1976) is a German former professional footballer who played as a goalkeeper. Schober is currently the director of Development at Schalke.

He appeared in 156 Bundesliga games during 16 seasons, with Schalke 04 (11 years) and Hansa Rostock (four).

Football career
Born in Marl, North Rhine-Westphalia, Schober started his professional career with FC Schalke 04 in 1994 and stayed there for six years, during which he was mainly barred by legendary Jens Lehmann. After the latter's departure for A.C. Milan he again played second-fiddle, now to Oliver Reck, but did manage 24 Bundesliga appearances from 1998 to 2000 combined.

After an unassuming spell at Hamburger SV, Schober settled in at F.C. Hansa Rostock where he was first-choice in five of his six seasons (only missing one match combined), two of those spent in the second division. He then rejoined Schalke at the beginning of the 2007–08 campaign, where he again backed up, now Manuel Neuer.

While playing with Hamburg, Schober was involved in the climax of 2000–01, in the final match of the season against FC Bayern Munich: the Bavarians needed at least a point to win the title over Schalke, his first team, but Hamburg took the lead in the 90th minute through Sergej Barbarez, only for Schober to immediately pick up a back pass from his teammate Tomáš Ujfaluši, thus giving Bayern an indirect free kick in his penalty area – Patrik Andersson smashed it home to win Bayern the title in dramatic fashion. He retired in June 2012 after his second spell in Gelsenkirchen, aged 36.

Career statistics

Honours
Schalke 04
DFB-Pokal: 2010–11
UEFA Cup: 1996–97
DFL-Ligapokal: Runner-up 2007

References

External links

1976 births
Living people
People from Marl, North Rhine-Westphalia
Sportspeople from Münster (region)
German footballers
Association football goalkeepers
Bundesliga players
2. Bundesliga players
FC Schalke 04 players
Hamburger SV players
FC Hansa Rostock players
Germany B international footballers
UEFA Cup winning players
Footballers from North Rhine-Westphalia
West German footballers